Hitt or HITT can refer to:

People

Politicians
 Arthur A. Hitt, American politician
 Edmund Hitt, American politician
 Henry D. Hitt, American politician
 Patricia Hitt, American politician
 Robert R. Hitt, American politician

Writers
 Brandi Hitt, American journalist
 David Hitt, American author
 Jack Hitt, American author

Educators
 Homer Hitt, dean of the University of New Orleans
 John Hitt, president of the University of Central Florida

Athletes
 Bruce Hitt, baseball player
 Roy Hitt, baseball player

Others
 Bryan Hitt, drummer of American rock band REO Speedwagon

Places
In the United States
 Hitt, Carroll County, Illinois
 Hitt, LaSalle County, Illinois
 Hitt, Missouri
 Hitt's Mill and Houses, a historic site in Maryland
 Samuel M. Hitt House, a historic site in Illinois

Other uses
 Heparin-induced thrombocytopenia, a type of disease
 Hittite Microwave Corporation, NASDAQ stock symbol
 HITT Production, a Turkish record label
 High-intensity interval training an exercise technique